Brian Feldman may refer to:

Brian Feldman (artist), American performance artist based in Washington, D.C.
Brian Feldman (politician) (born 1961), American state legislator from Maryland